Sunaura "Sunny" Taylor (born March 21, 1982) is an American painter, writer and activist for disability and animal rights. She currently resides in Oakland, California, and is Assistant Professor in the Department of Environmental Science, Policy and Management at the University of California, Berkeley.

Biography

Taylor's work has been displayed in the Smithsonian and in other important galleries across the United States. She is the recipient of a 2008 Joan Mitchell Foundation Award. In 2004, she received the Grand Prize in the VSA arts Driving Force juried exhibition for emerging disabled artists. A portion of her work deals with animal rights issues, as Taylor is an abolitionist vegan.

Taylor was born with arthrogryposis, and uses a wheelchair. She is active in the Society for Disability Studies and has participated in marches for disability rights. Her work on the disability rights movement has appeared in the Marxist magazine Monthly Review, and her Self Portrait with TCE was the first full-color image ever printed in the publication's long history. She has been featured on All Things Considered on National Public Radio, and the Georgia Public Television series State of the Arts. Her work has also been featured frequently in Flagpole Magazine in her home town, Athens, Georgia.

Taylor argued her position against animal products in her February 17, 2009 article titled "Is It Possible to Be a Conscientious Meat Eater?".

She is also the sister of the filmmaker Astra Taylor, and appeared in her 2008 film Examined Life alongside philosopher Judith Butler.

Publications

See also
 List of animal rights advocates

References

External links
 

1982 births
Living people
American animal rights scholars
American people with disabilities
American disability rights activists
Disability studies academics
People from Athens, Georgia
People with arthrogryposis
American women painters
Artists with disabilities
21st-century American women artists
American veganism activists
American women non-fiction writers